Jhansi Ki Rani is a 1953 Indian Hindi-language historical drama film produced and directed by Sohrab Modi for his Minerva Movietone production banner. It is credited as the first Technicolor film made in India and starred Modi's wife, Mehtab in the title role, with Modi in the important role of her mentor, Rajguru (royal adviser). The film was dubbed in English as The Tiger and the Flame, which released in 1956 with the same star cast. The cast besides Mehtab and Sohrab Modi included Mubarak, Ulhas, Sapru, Ram Singh, Baby Shikha, Marconi and Shakila.

Set in the 19th century against the backdrop of the Mutiny of 1857, the film is about the bravery of queen Lakshmibai, Rani of Jhansi, who took up arms and led her army against the British. She was one of the first Indians to do so. It was the most expensive Hindi film up until then, with a budget , but became a box office failure.

Plot 
Rajguru (Sohrab Modi) decides that Jhansi should get its proper recognition in history. He comes across a young girl, Manu (the young Rani Lakshmibai), played by Baby Shikha. Her father has been hit by a carriage driven by an English driver. She gathers a few children to confront the driver. This, and her confrontation with an elephant impresses the Rajguru who takes her in hand, shaping her into becoming a determined leader. He arranges for her, at the age of nine, to marry the much older ruler of Jhansi, Gangadhar Rao (Mubarak), who is about fifty years old, and become Queen.

Manu grows up under the expert tutelage of the Rajguru, learning physical combat and political administration. The older Manu, now called Lakshmibai gives birth to a boy who dies. She adopts another boy, Damodar Rao, who the English refuse to accept as the rightful heir. This further sets her against the British. During the uprising of 1857 (1857 Mutiny), she fights against them, succumbing to her injuries in the end.

Cast 
 Mehtab as Rani Lakshmibai
 Sohrab Modi as Rajguru
 Mubarak as Gangadhar Rao
 Sapru as General Sir Hugh Rose
 Ulhas as Ghulam Ghaus Khan
 Ram Singh as Sadashiv Rao
 Baby Shikha as Manu
 Anil Kishore as Lieut. Henry Dowker
 Kamlakant as Moropant
 S.B. Nayampalli as Panditji
 Michael Shea as Major Eliss
 Gloria Gasper as Doris Dowker
 Marconi as Colonel Sleeman
 Shakila as Kashi
 Dar Kashmiri

Production 
The film was released in India in 1952 (1953) as Jhansi Ki Rani and released in the US as The Tiger and the Flame in 1956. Modi had Hollywood technicians brought in to help in the technical aspect of the film. He managed to create the right era using historical details correctly. The main cinematographer was the Hollywood Oscar winner for Gone with the Wind (1939), Ernest Haller, who was assisted by M. N. Malhotra and Y. D. Sarpotdar. The editor was Russell Lloyd from England. The film deviated from the fictionalised accounts and stuck to the extracts from the novel Jhansi Ki Rani (1946) by Vrindavan Lal Verma

Sohrab Modi And Historicals 
Modi concentrated on Historicals, prominent of which were Pukar (1939), Jhansi Ki Rani and Mirza Ghalib (1954), which are "considered milestones of the genre".

Box-office 
The press praised the film lauding Modi's use of colour and direction.  However, in spite of having spent lavishly on technicians, sets, war scenes and making it in colour, the film was a big box office disaster causing Modi great financial losses. Modi was blamed for casting his wife Mehtab in the title role of Lakshmibai, who looked too old at 35 years to portray the young queen half her age.

Crew 
Crew
 Dialogue: L. Bijlani and Dialogue director was William DeLane Lea
 Screenplay: Geza Herceg, Adi F. Keeka and Sudarshan
 Audiographer: M. Eduljee

Soundtrack 
While the English version (1956, dubbed) had no songs, the Hindi version had music by Vasant Desai and lyrics by Pandit Radheshyam. The playback singers were Mohammed Rafi, Sulochana Kadam, Suman Purohit, Parshuram and P. Ramakant. Two songs in Mohammed Rafi's voice remain notable: "Amar Hai Jhansi Ki Rani" and "Rajguru Ne Jhansi Chhodi".

Songlist

Trivia 
Impressed by Hema Malini's performance in Razia Sultan (1983), Modi wanted to remake Jhansi Ki Rani with her in the lead.

References

External links 

1953 films
1950s Hindi-language films
Films directed by Sohrab Modi
Films scored by Vasant Desai
Films about the Indian Rebellion of 1857
1950s historical drama films
Indian historical drama films
Cultural depictions of Rani Laxmibai
1953 drama films